Above the Shadows is a 2019 supernatural romance film written and directed by Claudia Myers. The film stars Olivia Thirlby, Alan Ritchson, Jim Gaffigan, Maria Dizzia, Tito Ortiz, David Johansen, and Megan Fox.

It had its world premiere at the Brooklyn Film Festival on May 31, 2019, and was released to video on demand and select theaters on July 19, 2019, by Gravitas Ventures.

Premise 
A young woman (Olivia Thirlby) has faded from the world to the point of becoming invisible. After more than a decade existing in the shadows, Holly meets the one man who can see her, Shayne Blackwell (Alan Ritchson), a disgraced MMA fighter. Holly discovers that it was one of her tabloid photographs that caused his downfall, and that she must restore him to his former glory if she wants to regain a foothold in the world around her. With Shayne, Holly awakens to love but also to the possibility that she may remain invisible forever.

Cast 
 Olivia Thirlby as Holly
 Fina Strazza as Young Holly
 Alan Ritchson as Shayne
 Jim Gaffigan as Paul Jederman
 Maria Dizzia as Victoria Jederman
 Tito Ortiz as Attila
 David Johansen as Ron
 Megan Fox as Juliana
 Justine Cotsonas as Vanessa
 Lauren Hartman as Young Vanessa
 Owen Campbell as Troy 
 Alex Gemeinhardt as Young Troy
 Pawel Szajda as Marjus
 Patricia Pinto as Dancer
 Taylor Selé as Tommy Bones
 Thomas Canestraro as Carlos Suarez
 Kareem Savinon as Brandon
 R. Marcos Taylor as Khan
 Laura Heywood as Reporter #2

Production 
The film is based on an original script written by director Claudia Myers. On November 1, 2017, it was announced that Olivia Thirlby, Alan Ritchson, Jim Gaffigan, and Megan Fox were set to star in the film, which, at the time, was under the name Shadow Girl. Above the Shadows was produced by Tony Award-nominated company, HIPZEE, in association with Myriad Pictures, Boundary Stone Films, and BondIt Media Capital.

Release 
Above the Shadows premiered at the 22nd Brooklyn Film Festival (BFF) on May 31, 2019. It won the BFF Audience Choice Award for Narrative Feature. In May 2019, Gravitas Ventures acquired U.S. distribution rights to the film and set for a July 19, 2019, release.

Reception 
On Rotten Tomatoes the film has an approval rating of  based on reviews from  critics.

Courtney Howard of Variety wrote: "This magical-realist fairy tale, about a young woman feeling so isolated and insignificant after a tragic loss that she’s literally invisible to everyone except one other struggling soul, is certainly imaginative and intelligent in its ideas. However, the savvy smarts within don’t quite sustain the running time and, much like its protagonist, the film becomes transparent in its motives and sentimentality."
John DeFore of The Hollywood Reporter wrote: "Though it may be amusing to watch Holly sneak around and expose others' lies, it would be much more fun if her own story rang true." 
Noel Murray of the Los Angeles Times wrote: "Thirlby gives a good performance as someone who finds it easier to remain a non-person than to make any effort to fix her life. But the more Holly comes into view, the blander her character becomes."

References

External links 
 Official Site
 
 

2019 films
2010s romance films
Films set in New York (state)
American supernatural romance films
2010s supernatural films
Mixed martial arts films
2010s English-language films
2010s American films